The Cherry Hill Gourmet Market is a  Russian themed specialty grocery and deli located on the corner of Emmons Avenue and Ocean Avenue on the water in Sheepshead Bay, Brooklyn, New York City. It is the principal establishment occupying the former Lundy's Restaurant (now Lundy's Landing Shopping Plaza), which also houses Momoyama Japanese Restaurant and Masal Turkish Cafe on the first floor, and professional offices on the upper floors.

Opened by Russian born fruit and vegetable produce entrepreneur David Isaev in May 2009, the creation of the market put an end to attempts to revive Lundy's. The facade of the Lundy's building, an official New York City landmark, remains the same. The market and other businesses located within the landmark Lundy's structure remain embroiled in legal controversy due to ongoing violations in of zoning laws created to protect Lundy's.

Community opposition

The Lundy's Building underwent a seven million dollar renovation in order to be saved and reopened. Brooklynite neighborhood traditionalists have continued to attempt to force the new businesses out of the historic site. Community opposition centers on previous inclusion of the Lundy's building into a special maritime zoning district enacted in the 1970s to promote water-related commercial and recreational development. The Cherry Hill Gourmet Market also features tables for dinner, serves fish salad and a dozen kinds of smoked fish and caviar. However as such it is not primarily or exclusively a grocery store, and theoretically not permitted under the special zoning designation imposed on the historical Lundy's building, according to the New York City Department of Buildings. Mr. Isaev is involved in ongoing negotiations to legalize the market, and keep its roughly 100 workers employed. Isaev was hit with fines related to violation of the zoning laws, settled the fines with the New York City Landmarks Commission, and is now pursuing zoning changes which would legalize his and other businesses now housed within the Lundy's structure which are out of zoning compliance, which remain in operation despite being in technical violation of still legal and enforceable community zoning laws enacted to protect the Lundy's structure.

As part of a community settlement, Isaev, who removed the brass lettering 'Lundy Bros' and 'FWIL' for Lundy's founder Frederick William Irving Lundy from several arched doorways, restored the brass lettering to their original positions, and placed a large screen around large refrigeration units behind the market on the parking lot to settle landmark commission objections. The Lundy's building, which was a garbage-strewn decaying structure going to ruin when Mr. Isaev acquired it, is today a popular Brooklyn shopping spot for the Russian emigre communities situated in Sheepshead Bay, and nearby Manhattan Beach and Brighton Beach. In opening his establishment and later pursuing changing in the zoning laws applying to Lundy's, Isaev maintained he was unaware nor informed of all the complicated landmark designations and zoning requirements applying to the site when he signed his lease and opened a community business in good faith.

Hurricane Sandy flood

The effects of Hurricane Sandy in October 2012 caused the waters of Sheepshead Bay to overflow. The storm surge flooded the Cherry Hill Gourmet Market at ground level, causing it to sustain water damage and resulting in tons of spoiled food. During the post-hurricane cleanup the food had to be discarded, but the building was otherwise unaffected.

See also
 Russian Americans in New York City

References

Commercial buildings in Brooklyn
Sheepshead Bay, Brooklyn
Russian-American culture in New York City